Beautiful Oblivion is the third studio album by American metal band Issues, released on October 4, 2019, on Rise Records. It serves as a follow-up to their second studio album, Headspace (2016) and was produced by Howard Benson. The album showcases the group's progression of experimenting with other musical styles and influences, using elements of nu metal, progressive metal and djent, and influences of neo-soul, R&B, funk, electronica and pop. This was the band's last album to feature lead singer Tyler Carter before his departure for allegations of sexual misconduct in 2020.

The album was supported by three singles: "Tapping Out", "Drink About It" and "Flexin'". To promote the album, the band toured as support on American rock band I Prevail's Trauma North American tour and embarked on a headlining 2019 world tour in the US and UK.

After Headspace (2016), Issues began writing sessions for their third studio album. On January 4, 2018, it was revealed that the group had parted ways with original member and unclean vocalist Michael Bohn, thus making the band a four-piece moving forward. Guitarist AJ Rebollo and bass guitarist Skyler Acord subsequently took over screaming vocal duties for future tours, with Rebollo recording unclean vocals on studio performances. In between tours and recording sessions, lead singer Tyler Carter released his debut solo studio album, Moonshine, in February 2019, and embarked on a solo headlining tour. Tyler Acord, the band's former keyboardist and disc jockey, joined the band's studio sessions once more to program and perform synthesizers.

Promotion
On May 3, 2019, the band released the album's lead single, "Tapping Out". The music video for the song premiered June 26, 2019. The album's announcement was on August 11, 2019, and the second single, "Drink About It", was released accompanied with its music video the following day. A third single, "Flexin'", a 2 minute and 26 second disco-inspired pop and funk metal song, was released on September 27, along with its music video. On October 3, Rise Records hosted a live stream album listening party with members of the band giving commentary on the album's tracks.

The band toured as support on American rock band I Prevail's Trauma North American tour, from April 24 to August 9, 2019. The Beautiful Oblivion Tour is set to begin in the United Kingdom from October 7 to 17, with support from Lotus Eater, and will continue in North America from November 7 to December 15, 2019, with support from Polyphia, Sleep Token, and Lil Aaron.

On December 12, 2019, it was revealed that Issues would embark on Dance Gavin Dance's headlining 2020 spring tour with Animals As Leaders, Veil of Maya and Royal Coda in March and April. This tour was later postponed due to the COVID-19 pandemic.

On November 20, 2020, Issues released the instrumental version of the album on all streaming media and digital download platforms.

Composition
Beautiful Oblivion is a nu metal album with elements of progressive metal and djent, and influences of neo-soul, R&B, funk, electronica and pop. The album is the band's first release to not feature original member and unclean vocalist Michael Bohn, which led to significantly less screaming vocals being featured on the record, with the exception of guitarist AJ Rebollo's unclean vocals on a few tracks. Writing sessions for songs on the album began as early as 2014, when the band began reviving old demo recordings, while recording sessions took place between 2017 and 2019, in Calabasas, California with producer Howard Benson. Kris Crummett stepped down as producer and served as an engineer on the record. Ty "Lophiile" Acord, a former member of the band, helped compose and perform synthesizers and programming for the album. The band's recording sessions were heavily disrupted due to the 2018 California wildfires, which lead to the members having to evacuate on various occasions.

Lyrics and music

The opening track, "Here's To You"–a moody R&B-laden metal song–opens with a sample of Ty "Lophiile" Acord toying with a yo-yo. One of the first tracks composed for the album, it was co-written with Jamaican-American singer-songwriter Jesse Boykins III and features a vocal appearance from the band's bassist Skyler Acord on the bridge. The second track, "Drink About It", a groove metal and R&B song, was written by singer Tyler Carter with the lyrical subject matter dealing with "[a] cheater being found out by their unfortunate partner." "Find Forever", the album's third track, has been described by the group as "a wedding song", with the melody and top-line written by Skyler Acord. It also features famed saxophone player Antonio "Saxl Rose" Hancock and a choir. The fourth song, "Tapping Out", a nu metalcore track, was released as the lead single and features guitarist AJ Rebello performing unclean vocals on the bridge; Rebollo and Carter wrote the song about Rebollo's suicide attempt during recording sessions for the album. The fifth track, "Without You", a rap rock-pop metal song, was composed during the recording sessions for Headspace, in 2015, but was revisited for Beautiful Oblivion. "Rain", the sixth track, was musically inspired by pop punk, specifically Mayday Parade, with its lyricism dealing with "people who always drag the fucking mood down."

The seventh song, "Downfall", has been labeled as one of the heavier tracks on the record, featuring double drop C tuned guitars. It also features drum and bass inspired production from Enter Shikari keyboardist Rou Reynolds on the second verse. "Second Best", the eighth track, features both melancholic lyrics and upbeat nu metal elements, and was co-written by Carter with Bad Seed Rising singer and guitarist Francheska Pastor. The ninth song, "Get It Right", has been described as a stand-out on the record, with elements of neo-soul, R&B and 90s-inspired pop; lyrically, the track deals with sex. "Flexin'", the tenth song, began as a joke which later was decided by the band to be a track on the record featuring satirical lyrics about rebelling and elements of funk, electro-pop and disco. It was described as a freestyle exercise for Carter after growing tired of writing. "No Problem (Keep It Alive)", the eleventh song, was the first track written for the album, and features Nigerian-American singer Ivana Nwokike of VanJess. It features interpolated lyrics and vocal parts from "If You Love Me" by Brownstone and "Red Nose" by Sage the Gemini. The twelfth track, "Your Sake", is a piano ballad featuring no other instrumentation, becoming the first song by Issues to only feature piano and vocals. The thirteenth and final track, the title-track, features more electronica production with elements of nu metal and jazz.

Track listing

Personnel
Issues
 Tyler Carter – clean vocals, additional unclean vocals
 Adrian Rebollo – guitars, unclean vocals
 Skyler Acord – bass, additional vocals on “Here’s to You”
 Joshua Manuel – drums, percussion

Additional personnel
 Tyler Acord "Lophiile" – programming, composer, additional instrumentation, synthesizers

Production
 Digital editor – Paul DeCarli, Joe Rickard
 Engineer – Howard Benson, Michael Closson, Kris Crummett, Trevor Dietrich, Hatsukazu Inagaki, Ricky Orozco, Mike Plotnikoff
 Guitar technician - Marc VanGool
 Producer – Howard Benson

Charts

References

2019 albums
Issues (band) albums
Rise Records albums
Albums produced by Howard Benson